Segok-dong is a ward of Gangnam-gu in Seoul, South Korea. It is the most rural neighbourhood in Gangnam-gu.

Education
There are four schools located in Segok-dong, Seoul Jagok Elementary School, Seoul Semyung Elementary School, Seoul Daewang Elementary School and Segok Middle School.

See also 
Dong of Gangnam-gu

References

External links
 Official site

Neighbourhoods in Gangnam District